In Italian cinema, Giallo (plural gialli, from giallo, Italian for yellow) is a genre of Murder mystery fiction that often contains slasher, thriller, psychological horror, sexploitation, and, less frequently, supernatural horror elements.

This particular style of Italian-produced murder mystery horror-thriller film usually blends the atmosphere and suspense of thriller fiction with elements of horror fiction (such as slasher violence) and eroticism (similar to the French fantastique genre), and often involves a mysterious killer whose identity is not revealed until the final act of the film. The genre developed in the mid-to-late 1960s, peaked in popularity during the 1970s, and subsequently declined in commercial mainstream filmmaking over the next few decades, though examples continue to be produced. It was a predecessor to, and had significant influence on, the later American slasher film genre.

Literature
In the Italian language, giallo is a genre of novel including any literary genre involving crime and mystery, with all its sub-genres such as crime fiction, detective story, murder mystery or thriller-horror.

The term giallo ("yellow") derives from a series of crime-mystery pulp novels entitled Il Giallo Mondadori (Mondadori Yellow), published by Mondadori from 1929 and taking its name from the trademark yellow cover background. The series consisted almost exclusively of Italian translations of mystery novels by British and American writers. These included Agatha Christie, Ellery Queen, Edgar Wallace, Ed McBain, Rex Stout, Edgar Allan Poe and Raymond Chandler.

Published as cheap paperbacks, the success of the giallo novels soon began attracting the attention of other Italian publishing houses. They published their own versions and mimicked the yellow covers. The popularity of these series eventually established the word giallo as a synonym in Italian for a mystery novel. In colloquial and media usage in Italy, it also applied to a mysterious or unsolved affair.

Film
In the film context, for Italian audiences giallo refers to any kind of murder mystery or horror thriller, regardless of its national origin.

Meanwhile, English-speaking audiences have used the term giallo to refer specifically to a genre of Italian-produced thriller-horror films known to Italian audiences as giallo all'italiana.

In the English-speaking world, Italian giallo films are also sometimes referred to as Spaghetti Thrillers or Spaghetti Slashers, in a similar manner in which Italian Western films and poliziotteschi films from the same period have been referred to as Spaghetti Westerns and  Spaghetti crime films, respectively.

The Italian film subgenre began as literal adaptations of the original giallo mystery novels (see Giallo (1933 film)). Directors soon began taking advantage of modern cinematic techniques to create a unique genre that retained the mystery and crime fiction elements of giallo novels but veered more closely into the psychological thriller or psychological horror genres. Many of the typical characteristics of these films were incorporated into the later American slasher genre.

Characteristics

Most critics agree that the giallo represents a distinct category with unique features, but there is some disagreement on what exactly defines a giallo film. Gary Needham wrote:

<blockquote>By its very nature, the giallo challenges our assumptions about how non-Hollywood films should be classified, going beyond the sort of Anglo-American taxonomic imaginary that "fixes" genre both in film criticism and the film industry in order to designate something specific. ...however, despite the giallo'''s resistance to clear definition, there are nevertheless identifiable thematic and stylistic tropes.</blockquote>

These distinct "thematic and stylistic tropes" constitute a loose definition of the genre which is broadly consistent, though various critics have proposed slightly differing characteristic details (which consequently creates some confusion over which films can be considered gialli). Author Michael Mackenzie has written that gialli can be divided into the male-focused m. gialli, which usually sees a male outsider witness a murder and become the target of the killer when he attempts to solve the crime; and f. gialli, which features a female protagonist who is embroiled in a more sexual and psychological story, typically focusing on her sexuality, psyche and fragile mental state.

Although they often involve crime and detective work, gialli should not be confused with the other popular Italian crime genre of the 1970s, the poliziotteschi, which includes more action-oriented films about violent law enforcement officers (largely influenced by gritty American films such as Bullitt, Dirty Harry, Death Wish, The Godfather, Serpico, and The French Connection). Directors and actors often moved between both genres and there is some overlap between them. While most poliziotteschi dealt with organized crime and police responses to it, some early examples of the genre focused instead on murder investigations, and especially on cases where a woman had been murdered in sexual circumstances. These films were more psychological than action-driven, and borrowed various themes and motifs from gialli. Examples include Investigation of a Citizen Above Suspicion (1970) and No, the Case Is Happily Resolved (1973). Some films could even be considered under the banner of either genre, such as Fernando Di Leo's Naked Violence (1969) and Massimo Dallamano's 1974 film La polizia chiede aiuto (What Have They Done to Your Daughters?).

Structure

Giallo films are generally characterized as gruesome murder-mystery thrillers that combine the suspense elements of detective fiction with scenes of shocking horror, featuring excessive bloodletting, stylish camerawork and often jarring musical arrangements. The archetypal giallo plot involves a mysterious, black-gloved psychopathic killer who stalks and butchers a series of beautiful women. While most gialli involve a human killer, some also feature a supernatural element.

The typical giallo protagonist is an outsider of some type, often a traveller, tourist, outcast, or even an alienated or disgraced private investigator, and frequently a young woman, often a young woman who is lonely or alone in a strange or foreign situation or environment (gialli rarely or less frequently feature law enforcement officers as chief protagonists, which would be more characteristic of the poliziotteschi genre). The protagonists are generally or often unconnected to the murders before they begin and are drawn to help find the killer through their role as a witness to one of the murders. The mystery is the identity of the killer, who is often revealed in the climax to be another key character, who conceals his or her identity with a disguise (usually some combination of hat, mask, sunglasses, gloves, and trench coat). Thus, the literary whodunit element of the giallo novels is retained, while being filtered through horror genre elements and Italy's long-standing tradition of opera and staged grand guignol drama. The structure of giallo films is also sometimes reminiscent of the so-called "weird menace" pulp magazine horror mystery genre alongside Edgar Allan Poe and Agatha Christie.

It is important to note that while most gialli feature elements of this basic narrative structure, not all do. Some films (for example Mario Bava's 1970 Hatchet for the Honeymoon, which features the killer as the protagonist) may radically alter the traditional structure or abandon it altogether and still be considered gialli due to stylistic or thematic tropes, rather than narrative ones. A consistent element of the genre is an unusual lack of focus on coherent or logical narrative storytelling. While most have a nominal mystery structure, they may feature bizarre or seemingly nonsensical plot elements and a general disregard for realism in acting, dialogue and character motivation. As Jon Abrams wrote, "Individually, each [giallo] is like an improv exercise in murder, with each filmmaker having access to a handful of shared props and themes. Black gloves, sexual ambiguity, and psychoanalytic trauma may be at the heart of each film, but the genre itself is without consistent narrative form."

Content
While a shadowy killer and mystery narrative are common to most gialli, the most consistent and notable shared trope in the giallo tradition is the focus on grisly death sequences. The murders are invariably violent and gory, featuring a variety of explicit and imaginative attacks. These scenes frequently evoke some degree of voyeurism, sometimes going so far as to present the murder from the first-person perspective of the killer, with the black-gloved hand holding a knife viewed from the killer's point of view. The murders often occur when the victim is most vulnerable (showering, taking a bath, or scantily clad); as such, giallo films often include liberal amounts of nudity and sex, almost all of it featuring beautiful young women. Actresses associated with the genre include Edwige Fenech, Barbara Bach, Daria Nicolodi, Mimsy Farmer, Barbara Bouchet, Suzy Kendall, Ida Galli and Anita Strindberg. Due to the titillating emphasis on explicit sex and violence, gialli are sometimes categorized as exploitation cinema. The association of female sexuality and brutal violence has led some commentators to accuse the genre of misogyny.

Themes
Gialli are noted for psychological themes of madness, alienation, sexuality, and paranoia. The protagonist is usually a witness to a gruesome crime but frequently finds their testimony subject to skepticism from authority figures, leading to a questioning of their own perception and authority. This ambiguity of memory and perception can escalate to delusion, hallucination, or delirious paranoia. Since gialli protagonists are typically female, this can lead to what writer Gary Needham calls, "...the giallo's inherent pathologising of femininity and fascination with "sick" women." The killer is likely to be mentally-ill as well; giallo killers are almost always motivated by insanity caused by some past psychological trauma, often of a sexual nature (and sometimes depicted in flashbacks). The emphasis on madness and subjective perception has roots in the giallo novels (for example, Sergio Martino's Your Vice Is a Locked Room and Only I Have the Key was based on Edgar Allan Poe's short story "The Black Cat", which deals with a psychologically unstable narrator) but also finds expression in the tools of cinema. Writer Mikel J. Koven posits that gialli reflect an ambivalence over the social upheaval modernity brought to Italian culture in the 1960s.

"The changes within Italian culture... can be seen throughout the giallo film as something to be discussed and debated -- issues pertaining to identity, sexuality, increasing levels of violence, women's control over their own lives and bodies, history, the state -- all abstract ideas, which are all portrayed situationally as human stories in the giallo film.

Production

Gialli have been noted for their strong cinematic technique, with critics praising their editing, production design, music and visual style even in the marked absence of other facets usually associated with critical admiration (as gialli frequently lack characterization, believable dialogue, realistic performances and logical coherence in the narrative). Alexia Kannas wrote of 1968's La morte ha fatto l'uovo (Death Laid an Egg) that "While the film has garnered a reputation for its supreme narrative difficulty (just as many art films have), its aesthetic brilliance is irrefutable", while Leon Hunt wrote that frequent gialli director Dario Argento's work "vacillate[s] between strategies of art cinema and exploitation".

Visual style
Gialli are frequently associated with strong technical cinematography and stylish visuals. Critic Maitland McDonagh describes the visuals of Profondo rosso (Deep Red) as, "vivid colors and bizarre camera angles, dizzying pans and flamboyant tracking shots, disorienting framing and composition, fetishistic close-ups of quivering eyes and weird objects (knives, dolls, marbles, braided scraps of wool)..." Critic Roberto Curti describes the visual style of gialli in relation to the  counterculture era as, "a pop delirium filled with psychedelic paraphernalia". In addition to the iconic images of shadowy black-gloved killers and gruesome violence, gialli also frequently employ strongly stylized and even occasionally surreal uses of color. Directors Dario Argento and Mario Bava are particularly known for their impressionistic imagery and use of lurid colors, though other giallo directors (notably Lucio Fulci) employed more sedate, realistic styles as well. Due to their typical 1970s milieu, some commentators have also noted their potential for visual camp, especially in terms of fashion and decor.

Music
Music has been cited as a key to the genre's unique character; critic Maitland McDonagh describes  Profondo rosso (Deep Red) as an "overwhelming visceral experience...equal parts visual...and aural." Writer Anne Billson explains, "The Giallo Sound is typically an intoxicating mix of groovy lounge music, nerve-jangling discord, and the sort of soothing lyricism that belies the fact that it's actually accompanying, say, a slow motion decapitation", (she cites as an example Ennio Morricone's score for 1971's Four Flies on Grey Velvet). Many notable giallo soundtracks feature multi-instrumentalist, Alessandro Alessandroni, his vocal group, I Cantori Moderni and vocalist Edda Dell'Orso, including Morricone's score for Autopsy, and Bruno Nicolai's score for All the Colors of the Dark, which has been described as, "a balance of psychotic free jazz, aggressive bass driven beats, schizoid Eastern motifs, and childlike lullabies". Composers of note include Morricone,  Nicolai, and the Italian band Goblin. Other important composers known for their work on giallo films include Piero Umiliani (composer for Five Dolls for an August Moon), Riz Ortolani (The Pyjama Girl Case), Nora Orlandi (The Strange Vice of Mrs. Wardh), Stelvio Cipriani (The Iguana with the Tongue of Fire) and Fabio Frizzi (Sette note in nero a.k.a.The Psychic).

Titles
Gialli often feature lurid or baroque titles, frequently employing animal references or the use of numbers. Examples of the former trend include Sette scialli di seta gialla (Crimes of the Black Cat), Non si sevizia un paperino (Don't Torture a Duckling), La morte negli occhi del gatto (Seven Deaths in the Cat's Eye) and La tarantola dal ventre nero (Black Belly of the Tarantula); while instances of the latter include Sette note in nero (Seven Notes in Black) and The Fifth Cord.

History and development
The first giallo novel to be adapted for film was James M. Cain's The Postman Always Rings Twice, adapted in 1943 by  Luchino Visconti as Ossessione. Though the film was technically the first of Mondadori's giallo series to be adapted, its neo-realist style was markedly different from the stylized, violent character which subsequent adaptations would acquire. Condemned by the fascist government, Ossessione was eventually hailed as a landmark of neo-realist cinema, but it did not provoke any further giallo adaptations for almost 20 years.

In addition to the literary giallo tradition, early gialli were also influenced by the German "krimi" films of the early 1960s. Produced by Danish/German studio Rialto Film, these black-and-white crime movies based on Edgar Wallace stories typically featured whodunit mystery plots with a masked killer, anticipating several key components of the giallo movement by several years and despite their link to giallo author Wallace, though, they featured little of the excessive stylization and gore which would define Italian gialli.

The Swedish director Arne Mattsson has also been pointed to as a possible influence, in particular his 1958 film Mannequin in Red. Though the film shares stylistic and narrative similarities with later giallo films (particularly its use of color and its multiple murder plot), there is no direct evidence that subsequent Italian directors had seen it.

The first "true" giallo film is usually considered to be Mario Bava's The Girl Who Knew Too Much (1963). Its title alludes to Alfred Hitchcock's classic The Man Who Knew Too Much (1934, remade by Hitchcock in 1956), highlighting the early link between gialli and Anglo-American crime stories. Though shot in black and white and lacking the lurid violence and sexuality which would define later gialli, the film has been credited with establishing the essential structure of the genre: in it, a young American tourist in Rome witnesses a murder, finds her testimony dismissed by the authorities, and must attempt to uncover the killer's identity herself. Bava drew on the krimi tradition as well as the Hitchcockian style referenced in the title, and the film's structure served as a basic template for many of the gialli that would follow.

Bava followed The Girl Who Knew Too Much the next year with the stylish and influential Blood and Black Lace (1964). It introduced a number of elements that became emblematic of the genre: a masked stalker with a shiny weapon in his black-gloved hand who brutally murders a series of glamorous fashion models. Though the movie was not a financial success at the time, the tropes it introduced (particularly its black-gloved killer, provocative sexuality, and bold use of color) would become iconic of the genre."Lucas, Tim. Blood and Black Lace DVD, Image Entertainment, 2005, liner notes. ASIN: B000BB1926

Several similarly-themed crime/thriller movies followed in the next few years, including early efforts from directors Antonio Margheriti (Nude... si muore [Naked You Die] in 1968),  Romolo Girolami (Il dolce corpo di Deborah [The Sweet Body of Deborah] in 1968), Umberto Lenzi (Orgasmo in 1969, Paranoia [A Quiet Place to Kill] and Così dolce... così perversa [So Sweet... So Perverse] in 1969), Riccardo Freda (A doppia faccia [Double Face] in 1969) and Lucio Fulci (Una sull'altra [One on Top of the Other] in 1969), all of whom would go on to become major creative forces in the burgeoning genre. But it was Dario Argento's first feature, in 1970, that turned the giallo into a major cultural phenomenon. That film, The Bird with the Crystal Plumage, was greatly influenced by Blood and Black Lace, and introduced a new level of stylish violence and suspense that helped redefine the genre. The film was a box office smash and was widely imitated. Its success provoked a frenzy of Italian films with stylish, violent, and sexually provocative murder plots (Argento alone made three more in the next five years) essentially cementing the genre in the public consciousness. In 1996, director Michele Soavi wrote, "there's no doubt that it was Mario Bava who started the 'spaghetti thrillers' [but] Argento gave them a great boost, a turning point, a new style...'new clothes'. Mario had grown old and Dario made it his own genre... this had repercussions on genre cinema, which, thanks to Dario, was given a new lease on life." The success of The Bird with the Crystal Plumage provoked a decade which saw multiple gialli produced every year. In English-language film circles, the term giallo gradually became synonymous with a heavy, theatrical and stylized visual element.

Popularity and legacy

The giallo genre had its heyday from 1968 through 1978. The most prolific period, however, was the five-year timespan between 1971 and 1975, during which time over 100 different gialli were produced (see filmography below). Directors like Bava, Argento, Fulci, Lenzi, Freda and Margheriti continued to produce gialli throughout the 70s and beyond, and were soon joined by other notable directors including Sergio Martino, Paolo Cavara, Armando Crispino, Ruggero Deodato and Bava's son Lamberto Bava. The genre also spread to Spain by the early 70s, resulting in films like La residencia (The House That Screamed) (1969) and Los Ojos Azules de la Muñeca Rota (Blue Eyes Of The Broken Doll) (1973) which had unmistakable giallo characteristics but feature Spanish casts and production talent. Though they preceded the first giallo by a few years, German krimi films continued to be made contemporaneously with early gialli, and were also influenced by their success. As the popularity of krimis declined in Germany, Rialto Film began increasingly pairing with Italian production companies and filmmakers (such as composer Ennio Morricone and director, cinematographer Joe D'Amato, who worked on later krimi films following their successes in Italy). The overlap between the two movements is extensive enough that one of Rialto's final krimi films, Cosa avete fatto a Solange? (What Have You Done to Solange?), features an Italian director and crew and has been called a giallo in its own right.

Gialli continued to be produced throughout the 1970s and 1980s, but gradually their popularity diminished and film budgets and production values began shrinking. Director Pupi Avati satirized the genre in 1977 with a slapstick giallo titled Tutti defunti... tranne i morti.

Though the giallo cycle waned in the 1990s and saw few entries in the 2000s, they continue to be produced, notably by Argento (who in 2009 released a film actually titled Giallo, somewhat in homage to his long career in the genre) and co-directors Hélène Cattet and Bruno Forzani, whose Amer (which uses music from older giallis, including tracks by Morricone and Bruno Nicolai) received a positive critical reception upon its release in 2009. To a large degree, the genre's influence lives on in the slasher films which became enormously popular during the 1980s and drew heavily on tropes developed by earlier gialli.

Influence
The giallo cycle has had a lasting effect on horror films and murder mysteries made outside Italy since the late 1960s as this cinematic style and unflinching content is also at the root of the gory slasher and splatter films that became widely popular in the early 1980s. In particular, two violent shockers from Mario Bava, Hatchet for the Honeymoon (1970) and Twitch of the Death Nerve (1971) were especially influential.

Early examples of the giallo effect can be seen in the British film Berserk! (1967) and such American mystery-thrillers as No Way to Treat a Lady (1968), the Oscar-winning Klute (1971), Pretty Maids All in a Row (1971, based on an Italian novel), Alfred Hitchcock's Frenzy (1972), Vincent Price's Madhouse (1974), Eyes of Laura Mars (1978) and Brian De Palma's Dressed to Kill (1980). Berberian Sound Studio (2012) offers an affectionate tribute to the genre.

Director Eli Roth has called the giallo "one of my favorite, favorite subgenres of film," and specifically cited Sergio Martino's Torso (I corpi presentano tracce di violenza carnale) (along with the Spanish horror film Who Can Kill a Child?) as influential on his 2005 film Hostel, writing, "...these seventies Italian giallos start off with a group of students that are in Rome, lots of scenes in piazzas with telephoto lenses, and you get the feeling they're being watched. There's this real ominous creepy feeling. The girls are always going on some trip somewhere and they're all very smart. They all make decisions the audience would make."

Filmography
1960s
 The Girl Who Knew Too Much (Mario Bava, 1963; Italian: La ragazza che sapeva troppo) a.k.a. Evil Eye Blood and Black Lace (Mario Bava, 1964; Italian: Sei donne per l'assassino / Six Women for the Murderer) a.k.a. Fashion House of Death The Monster of London City (Edwin Zbonek, 1964) German krimi film that predated the Italian giallo format
 The Embalmer (Dino Tavella, 1965; Italian: Il mostro di Venezia / The Monster of Venice) 
 Libido (Ernesto Gastaldi, 1965)
 The Possessed (Luigi Bazzoni and Franco Rossellini, 1965; Italian: La donna del lago / The Lady of the Lake) a.k.a. Love, Hate and Dishonor Night of Violence (Roberto Mauri, 1965; Italian: Le notti della violenza / Nights of Violence) a.k.a. Call Girls 66 The Third Eye (Mino Guerrini, 1966; Italian: Il terzo occhio)
 A... For Assassin (Angelo Dorigo, 1966; Italian: A... come Assassino)
 The Murder Clinic (Elio Scardamaglia, 1966; Italian: La lama nel corpo / The Knife in the Body) a.k.a. Nights of Terror, a.k.a. Revenge of the Living Dead  Date for a Murder (Mino Guerrini, 1966; Italian: Omicidio per appuntamento/ Murder by Appointment) 
 The Murderer with the Silk Scarf (Adrian Hoven, 1966; German: Der Mörder mit dem Seidenschal) starring Helga Line
 Killer Without a Face (Angelo Dorigo, 1967; Italian: Assassino senza volto) starring Janine Reynaud
 Deadly Sweet (Tinto Brass, 1967; Italian: Col cuore in gola/ With Heart in Mouth)  a.k.a. I Am What I Am The Sweet Body of Deborah (Romolo Guerrieri, 1968; Italian: Il dolce corpo di Deborah)
 Death Laid an Egg (Giulio Questi, 1968; Italian: La morte ha fatto l'uovo) a.k.a. Plucked, a.k.a. A Curious Way to Love A Quiet Place in the Country (Elio Petri, 1968; Italian: Un tranquillo posto di campagna)
  The Young, the Evil and the Savage (Antonio Margheriti, 1968;  Italian: Nude... si muore/ Naked... You Die!) a.k.a. The Schoolgirl Killer Deadly Inheritance (Vittorio Sindoni, 1968; Italian: L'assassino ha le mani pulite / The Killer has Clean Hands)
 Run, Psycho, Run (Brunello Rondi, 1968; Italian: Più tardi Claire, più tardi...) starring Janine Renaud
 A Black Veil for Lisa (Massimo Dallamano, 1968; Italian: La morte non ha sesso / Death Has No Sex)
 Interrabang (Giuliano Biagetti, 1969)
 A Complicated Girl (Damiano Damiani, 1969; Italian: Una ragazza piuttosto complicata/ A Rather Complicated Girl) starring Florinda Bolkan
 So Sweet...So Perverse (Umberto Lenzi, 1969; Italian: Così dolce...così perversa)
 The Doll of Satan (Ferruccio Casapinta, 1969; Italian: La bambola di Satana)
 One on Top of the Other (Lucio Fulci, 1969; Italian: Una sull'altra) a.k.a.Perversion Story Murder by Music (Julio Buchs, 1969; Spanish: Las trompetas del apocalipsis/ Trumpets of the Apocalypse); starring Brett Halsey, Marilu Tolo
 The House That Screamed (Narciso Ibáñez Serrador, Spanish, 1969) a.k.a. La residencia, a.k.a. The Boarding School Death Knocks Twice (Harald Philipp, 1969; Italian: La morte bussa due volte) a.k.a. Blonde Bait for the Murderer, a.k.a. Hard Women, a.k.a. The Blonde Connection Double Face (Riccardo Freda, 1969; Italian: A doppia faccia) a.k.a.Liz et Helen Macabre (Javier Setó, 1969; Spanish: Viaje al vacío / Journey to Emptiness) a.k.a. The Invisible Assassin, a.k.a. Shadow of Death Orgasmo (Umberto Lenzi, 1969) released in USA as Paranoia1970s
 The Bird with the Crystal Plumage (Dario Argento, 1970; Italian: L'uccello dalle piume di cristallo) a.k.a. Phantom of Terror, a.k.a. The Gallery Murders Hatchet for the Honeymoon (Mario Bava, 1970; Italian: Il rosso segno della follia / The Red Mark of Madness) a.k.a. Blood Brides Paranoia (Umberto Lenzi, 1970) released in USA as A Quiet Place to Kill Five Dolls for an August Moon (Mario Bava, 1970; Italian: 5 bambole per la luna d'agosto) a.k.a. Island of Terror Death Occurred Last Night (Duccio Tessari, 1970; Italian: La morte risale a ieri sera A Suitcase for a Corpse (Alfonso Brescia, 1970; Italian: Il tuo dolce corpo da uccidere / Your Sweet Body to Murder)
 Your Hands on My Body (Brunello Rondi, 1970; Italian: Le tue mani sul mio corpo) a.k.a. Schocking 
 Forbidden Photos of a Lady Above Suspicion (Luciano Ercoli, 1970; Italian: Le foto proibite di una signora per bene)
 Kill the Fatted Calf and Roast It (Salvatore Samperi, 1970; Italian: Uccidete il vitello grasso e arrostitelo)
 In the Folds of the Flesh (Sergio Bergonzelli, 1970; Italian: Nelle pieghe della carne)
 The Weekend Murders (Michele Lupo, 1970; Italian: Concerto per pistola solista) a.k.a. The Story of a Crime The Man with Icy Eyes (Alberto De Martino, 1971; Italian: L'uomo dagli occhi di ghiaccio)
 A Lizard in a Woman's Skin (Lucio Fulci, 1971; Italian: Una lucertola con la pelle di donna) a.k.a. Schizoid The Fifth Cord (Luigi Bazzoni, 1971; Italian: Giornata nera per l'ariete / Black Day for the Ram) a.k.a. Evil Fingers Oasis of Fear (Umberto Lenzi, 1971; Italian: Un posto ideale per uccidere / An Ideal Place to Kill) a.k.a. Dirty Pictures The Strange Vice of Mrs. Wardh (Sergio Martino, 1971; Italian: Lo strano vizio della Signora Wardh) a.k.a. Blade of the Ripper, a.k.a. Next!, a.k.a. The Next Victim The Case of the Scorpion's Tail (Sergio Martino, 1971; Italian: La coda dello scorpione / Tail of the Scorpion)
 Black Belly of the Tarantula (Paolo Cavara, 1971; Italian: La tarantola dal ventre nero)
 The Cat o' Nine Tails (Dario Argento, 1971; Italian: Il gatto a nove code)
 The Bloodstained Butterfly (Duccio Tessari, 1971; Italian: Una farfalla con le ali insanguinate) a.k.a. Secret of the Black Rose Four Flies on Grey Velvet (Dario Argento, 1971; Italian: 4 mosche di velluto grigio)
 Marta (José Antonio Nieves Conde, 1971; Italian: ...dopo di che, uccide il maschio e lo divora / Afterwards, It Kills and Devours the Male)
 The Double (Romolo Guerrieri, 1971; Italian: La Controfigura) a.k.a. Love Inferno 
 Cross Current (Tonino Ricci, 1971; Italian: Un Omicidio perfetto a termine di legge / A Perfect Murder According to Law)
 The Iguana with the Tongue of Fire (Riccardo Freda, 1971; Italian: L'iguana dalla lingua di fuoco)
 A Bay of Blood (Mario Bava, 1971; Italian: Reazione a catena / Chain Reaction) a.k.a. Twitch of the Death Nerve, a.k.a. Ecologia del delitto / Ecology of Crime, a.k.a. Last House on the Left Part 2 They Have Changed Their Face (Corrado Farina, 1971; Italian: Hanno cambiato faccia)
 The Designated Victim (Maurizio Lucidi, 1971;  Italian: La vittima designata) a.k.a. Murder by Design Slaughter Hotel (Fernando Di Leo, 1971; Italian: La bestia uccide a sangue freddo / The Beast Kills in Cold Blood) a.k.a. Asylum Erotica, a.k.a. The Cold-Blooded Beast The Fourth Victim (Eugenio Martín, 1971; Italian: In fondo alla piscina / At the Front of the Pool) a.k.a.Death at the Deep End of the Pool,  a.k.a.La ultima senora Anderson / The Last Mrs. Anderson, starring Carroll Baker
 The Devil Has Seven Faces (Osvaldo Civirani, 1971; Italian: Il diavolo ha sette facce) a.k.a. The Devil with Seven Faces Seven Murders for Scotland Yard (José Luis Madrid, 1971; Spanish: Jack el destripador de Londres/ Jack the Ripper of London) a.k.a. Seven Corpses for Scotland Yard Death Walks on High Heels (Luciano Ercoli, 1971; Italian: La morte cammina con i tacchi alti) 
 The Short Night of the Glass Dolls (Aldo Lado, 1971; Italian: La corta notte delle bambole di vetro) a.k.a. Paralyzed Cold Eyes of Fear (Enzo G. Castellari, 1971; Italian: Gli occhi freddi della paura) a.k.a. Desperate MomentsHuman Cobras (Bitto Albertini, written by Ernesto Gastaldi, 1971; Italian: L'uomo più velenoso del cobra)
 In the Eye of the Hurricane (José María Forqué, 1971;  Italian: La volpe dalla coda di velluto / The Fox with a Velvet Tail)
 The Glass Ceiling (Eloy de la Iglesia, 1971; Spanish: El techo de cristal) stars Patty Shepard and Emma Cohen
 Two Males for Alexa / Due maschi per Alexa (Juan Logar, 1971;  Spanish: Fieras sin jaula/ Cageless Beasts) stars Rosalba Neri and Emma Cohen
 The Night Evelyn Came Out of the Grave (Emilio Miraglia, 1971; Italian: La notte che Evelyn uscì dalla tomba)
 The Great Swindle (José Antonio Nieves Conde, 1971; Spanish: Historia de una traición)
 Amuck! (Silvio Amadio, 1971; Italian: Alla ricerca del piacere / In Pursuit of Pleasure) a.k.a. Maniac Mansion, a.k.a. Leather and Whips, a.k.a. Hot Bed of Sex The Red Headed Corpse (Renzo Russo, 1972; Italian: La rossa dalla pelle che scotta) a.k.a. The Sensuous Doll The Case of the Bloody Iris (Giuliano Carnimeo, 1972; Italian: Perché quelle strane gocce di sangue sul corpo di Jennifer? / What Are Those Strange Drops of Blood on Jennifer's Body?)
 Don't Torture a Duckling (Lucio Fulci, 1972; Italian: Non si sevizia un paperino) a.k.a. The Long Night of Exorcism Who Killed the Prosecutor and Why? (Giuseppe Vari, 1972; Italian: Terza ipotesi su un caso di perfetta strategia criminale / Third hypothesis about a perfect criminal strategy case)
 Death Walks at Midnight (Luciano Ercoli, 1972: Italian: La morte accarezza a mezzanotte/ Death Caresses at Midnight) a.k.a. Cry Out in Terror Alta Tension / High Tension (Julio Buchs, 1972; Spanish: Doppia coppia con Regina) starring Helga Line, Marisa Mell
 An Open Tomb...An Empty Coffin (Alfonso Balcázar, 1972; Spanish: La casa de las muertas vivientes / House of the Living Dead Women) a.k.a. The Nights of the Scorpion Who Saw Her Die? (Aldo Lado, 1972; Italian: Chi l'ha vista morire?)
 My Dear Killer (Tonino Valerii, 1972; Italian: Mio caro assassino)
 Spirits of Death (Romano Scavolini, 1972; Italian: Un bianco vestito per Marialé/ A White Dress for Mariale) a.k.a. Exorcisme Tragique 
 Your Vice Is a Locked Room and Only I Have the Key (Sergio Martino, 1972; Italian: Il tuo vizio è una stanza chiusa e solo io ne ho la chiave) a.k.a. Gently Before She Dies, a.k.a. Eye of the Black Cat, a.k.a. Excite Me! The French Sex Murders (Ferdinando Merighi, 1972; Italian: Casa d'appuntamento/ The House of Rendezvous) a.k.a. The Bogey Man and the French Murders Death Falls Lightly (Leopoldo Savona, 1972; Italian: La morte scende leggera)
 Smile Before Death (Silvio Amadio, 1972; Italian: Il sorriso della iena/ Smile of the Hyena)
 What Have You Done to Solange? (Massimo Dallamano, 1972; Italian: Cosa avete fatto a Solange?)  a.k.a. Secret of the Green Pins, a.k.a. Who's Next?, a.k.a. Terror in the Woods Knife of Ice (Umberto Lenzi, 1972; Italian: Il coltello di ghiaccio)  
 Eye in the Labyrinth (Mario Caiano, 1972; Italian: L'occhio nel labirinto) a.k.a. Blood, starring Alida Valli
 Murder Mansion (Francisco Lara Polop, 1972; Italian: Quando Marta urlò dalla tomba / When Marta Screamed from the Grave) a.k.a. The House in the Fog All the Colors of the Dark (Sergio Martino, 1972; Italian: Tutti i colori del buio) a.k.a. Day of the Maniac, a.k.a. They're Coming to Get You! The Killer is on the Phone (Alberto De Martino, 1972; Italian: L'assassino e' al telefono) a.k.a. Scenes From a Murder, starring Telly Savalas
 Tropic of Cancer (Edoardo Mulargia, 1972;  Italian: Al Tropico del Cancro) a.k.a. Death in Haiti Love and Death in the Garden of the Gods (Sauro Scavolini, 1972; Italian: Amore e morte nel giardino degli dei)
 The Dead Are Alive (Armando Crispino, 1972; Italian: L'etrusco uccide ancora / The Etruscan Kills Again)
 So Sweet, So Dead (Roberto Montero, 1972; Italian: Rivelazione di un maniaco sessuale/ Revelations of a Sex Maniac) a.k.a. The Slasher is the Sex Maniac, a.k.a. Penetration Delirium (Renato Polselli, 1972; Italian: Delirio caldo)
 Seven Blood-Stained Orchids (Umberto Lenzi, 1972; Italian: Sette orchidee macchiate di rosso)
 The Crimes of the Black Cat (Sergio Pastore, 1972; Italian: Sette scialli di seta gialla / Seven Shawls of Yellow Silk)
 Naked Girl Killed in the Park (Alfonso Brescia, 1972; Italian: Ragazza tutta nuda assassinata nel parco) a.k.a. Naked Girl Found in the Park The Two Faces of Fear (Tulio Demicheli, 1972; Italian: I due volti della paura) a.k.a. Two Faces of Terror, starring Anita Strindberg, George Hilton
 The Weapon, the Hour, the Motive (Francesco Mazzei, 1972; Italian: L'arma, l'ora, il movente)
 The Red Queen Kills Seven Times (Emilio Miraglia, 1972; Italian: La dama rossa uccide sette volte) a.k.a. Blood Feast, a.k.a. Feast of Flesh The Cat in Heat (Nello Rossati, 1972; Italian: La gatta en calore)
 A.A.A. Masseuse, Good-Looking, Offers Her Services (Demofilo Fidani, 1972; Italian: A.A.A. Massaggiatrice bella presenza offresi...)
 Death Carries a Cane (Maurizio Pradeaux, 1973) Italian: Passi di danza su una lama di rasoio / Dance Steps on a Razor's Edge; a.k.a. Maniac at Large, a.k.a. Tormentor Torso (Sergio Martino, 1973; Italian: I corpi presentano tracce di violenza carnale / The Bodies Show Traces of Carnal Violence)
 The Flower with the Petals of Steel (Gianfranco Piccioli, 1973; Italian: Il fiore dai petali d'acciaio / The Flower with the Deadly Sting) starring Carroll Baker
 Seven Deaths in the Cat's Eye (Antonio Margheriti, 1973; Italian: La morte negli occhi del gatto / Death in the Eyes of the Cat)The Bloodstained Lawn (Riccardo Ghione, 1973; Italian: Il prato macchiato di rosso)
 The Sex of the Witch (Angelo Pannaccio, 1973; Italian: Il sesso della strega) starring Camille Keaton
 Love and Death on the Edge of a Razor (Giusseppe Pellegrini, 1973; Italian: Giorni d'amore sul filo di una lama) a.k.a.Muerte au Rasoir The Crimes of Petiot (José Luis Madrid, 1973; Spanish: Los crímenes de Petiot)
 Death Smiles on a Murderer (Joe D'Amato, 1973; Italian: La morte ha sorriso all'assassino)
 No One Heard the Scream (Eloy de la Iglesia, 1973; Spanish: Nadie oyó gritar)
 Don't Look Now (Nicolas Roeg, 1973; Italian: A Venezia... un Dicembre rosso shocking / In Venice... a Shocking Red December)
 The Perfume of the Lady in Black (Francesco Barilli, 1974; Italian: Il profumo della signora in nero)
 Delitto d'autore (Mario Sabatini, 1974; translation: Copyright Crime) starring Sylva Koscina, Luigi Pistilli
 Blue Eyes of the Broken Doll (Carlos Aured, 1974; Spanish: Los ojos azules de la muñeca rota) a.k.a. House of Psychotic Women Five Women for the Killer (Stelvio Massi, 1974; Italian: Cinque donne per l'assassino)
 Spasmo (Umberto Lenzi, 1974)
 Puzzle (Duccio Tessari, 1974; Italian: L'uomo senza memoria / The Man Without a Memory)
 The Girl in Room 2A (William Rose, 1974, Italian: La casa della paura / The House of Fear)  a.k.a. The Perversions of Mrs. Grant The Killer Reserved Nine Seats (Giuseppe Bennati, 1974; Italian: L'assassino ha riservato nove poltrone)
 What Have They Done to Your Daughters? (Massimo Dallamano, 1974; Italian: La polizia chiede aiuto / The Police Need Help) a.k.a. The Co-ed Murders Ciak...si muore (Mario Moroni, 1974; rough translation: Clack...You Die (as in the sound a clapboard makes))
 The Killer Is One of the Thirteen (Javier Aguirre, 1974; Spanish: El asesino está entre los trece)
 The Killer Wore Gloves (Juan Bosch, 1974; Spanish: La Muerte llama a las diez / Death Calls at Ten) a.k.a. Le calde labbra del carnefice / The Hot Lips of the Killer The Killer With a Thousand Eyes (Juan Bosch, 1974; Spanish: Los mil ojos del asesino) a.k.a. On The Edge The Fish With the Gold Eyes (Pedro Luis Ramírez, 1974, Spanish: El pez del los ojos de oro) starring Monserrat Prous
 Death Will Have Your Eyes (Giovanni D'Eramo, 1974; Italian: La moglie giovane/ The Young Wife) a.k.a. Triangle, a.k.a. Infamia                                        
 Eyeball (Umberto Lenzi, 1975; Italian: Gatti rossi in un labirinto di vetro / Red Cats in a Glass Maze) a.k.a. Wide-Eyed in the Dark Autopsy (Armando Crispino, 1975; Italian: Macchie solari / Sunspots)
 The Killer Must Kill Again (Luigi Cozzi, 1975; Italian: L'assassino è costretto ad uccidere ancora) a.k.a. Il Ragno (The Spider), a.k.a. The Dark is Death's Friend Giochi erotici di una famiglia per bene/ Erotic Games of a Good Family (Francesco Degli Espinosa, 1975) starring Erica Blanc
 All the Screams of Silence (Ramón Barco, 1975, Spanish: Todo los gritos del silencio)
 A Dragonfly for Each Corpse (León Klimovsky, 1975; Spanish: Una libélula para cada muerto)
 La pelle sotto gli artigli/ The Skin Under the Claws (Alessandro Santini, 1975) starring Gordon Mitchell
 Footprints on the Moon (Luigi Bazzoni, 1975; Italian: Le orme/ Footsteps)
 Deep Red (Dario Argento, 1975; Italian: Profondo rosso) a.k.a.The Hatchet Murders 
 Strip Nude for Your Killer (Andrea Bianchi, 1975) a.k.a. Nude per l'assassino The Killer is Not Alone (Jesus Garcia de Duenas, 1975; Spanish: El asesino no está solo) starring Maria Rohm
 Reflections in Black (Tano Cimarosa, 1975; Italian: Il vizio ha le calze nere / Vice Wears Black Hose)
 The Suspicious Death of a Minor (Sergio Martino, 1975; Italian: Morte sospetta di una minorenne) a.k.a. Too Young to Die The Bloodsucker Leads the Dance (Alfredo Rizzo, 1975; Italian: La sanguisuga conduce la danza) a.k.a. The Passion of Evelyn ...a tutte le auto della polizia (Mario Caiano, 1975; English: Calling All Police Cars) a.k.a. The Maniac Responsible Snapshot of a Crime (Mario Imperoli, 1975; Italian: Istantanea per un delitto)
 The Police Are Blundering in the Dark (Helia Colombo, 1975; Italian: La polizia brancola nel buio)
 The House with Laughing Windows (Pupi Avati, 1976; Italian: La casa dalle finestre che ridono)
 Plot of Fear (Paolo Cavara, 1976; Italian: E tanta paura/ Too Much Fear) a.k.a. Bloody Peanuts Death Haunts Monica (Ramón Fernández, 1976; Spanish: La Muerte Ronda a Monica) starring Jean Sorel
 Death Steps in the Dark (Maurizio Pradeaux, 1977; Italian: Passi di morte perduti nel buio)
 Crazy Desires of a Murderer (Filippo Walter Ratti, 1977; Italian: I vizi morbosi di una governante/ The Morbid Vices of a Housekeeper)
 The Psychic (Lucio Fulci, 1977) a.k.a. Sette note in nero) a.k.a. Murder to the Tune of Seven Black Notes The Pyjama Girl Case (Flavio Mogherini, 1977; Italian: La ragazza dal pigiama giallo / The Girl in the Yellow Pyjamas)
 Watch Me When I Kill (Antonio Bido, 1977; Italian: Il gatto dagli occhi di giada / The Cat with the Jade Eyes) a.k.a. The Cat's Victims The Eyes Behind the Wall (Giuliano Petrelli, 1977; Italian: L'occhio dietro la parete) starring John Phillip Law
 Nine Guests for a Crime (Ferdinando Baldi, 1977; Italian: 9 ospiti per un delitto) a.k.a. A Cry in the Night Suspiria (Dario Argento, 1977)
 Hotel Fear (Francesco Barilli, 1978; Italian: Pensione Paura)
 The Sister of Ursula (Enzo Milioni, 1978; Italian: La sorella di Ursula) a.k.a. La muerte tiene ojos / Death Has Eyes, a.k.a. Ursula's Sister Red Rings of Fear (Alberto Negrin, 1978; Italian: Enigma rosso/ Red Enigma) a.k.a. Virgin Terror, a.k.a. Trauma, a.k.a. Rings of Fear The Bloodstained Shadow (Antonio Bido, 1978; Italian: Solamente nero / Only Blackness)
 L'immoralità (Massimo Pirri, 1978) a.k.a. Cock Crows at Eleven 
 The Perfect Crime (Giuseppe Rosati, 1978; Italian: Indagine su un delitto perfetto/ Investigation of a Perfect Crime) starring Joseph Cotten, Paul Muller
 Trauma (Leon Klimovsky, 1978; Spanish: Violacion Fatal) starring Antoio Mayans
 Atrocious Tales of Love and Death (Sergio Corbucci, 1979; Italian: Giallo napoletano) a.k.a. Melodie meurtriere, a.k.a. Atrocious Tales of Love and Revenge                                                                                                    
 Killer Nun (Giulio Berutti, 1979; Italian: Suir omicidi) a.k.a. Deadly Habit The Sky is Falling (Silvio Narizzano, 1979; Spanish: Las Flores del Vicio) a.k.a. Bloodbath, starring Carroll Baker
 Giallo a Venezia (Mario Landi, 1979) a.k.a. Giallo in Venice, a.k.a. Giallo, Venetian Style Play Motel (Mario Gariazzo, 1979)

1980s
 Trhauma (Gianni Martucci, 1980; Italian: Il mistero della casa maledetta / Mystery of the Cursed House) a.k.a. Thrauma Murder Obsession (Riccardo Freda, 1981; Italian: Follia omicida / Murder Madness) a.k.a. Fear, a.k.a. The Wailing, a.k.a. The Murder Syndrome The Secret of Seagull Island (Nestore Ungaro, 1981; Italian: L'isola del gabbiano) this was the feature version edited from a 1981 TV miniseries called Seagull Island;  a British/Italian co-production
 Inferno (Dario Argento, 1980)
 Madhouse (Ovidio Assonitis, 1981) a.k.a. There Was a Little Girl, a.k.a. And When She Was Bad Nightmare (Romano Scavolini, 1981) a.k.a. Nightmares in a Damaged Brain Tenebrae (Dario Argento, 1982) a.k.a. Unsane The Scorpion with Two Tails (Sergio Martino, 1982; Italian: Assassinio al cimitero etrusco / Murder in the Etruscan Cemetery)
 The New York Ripper (Lucio Fulci, 1982; Italian: Lo squartatore di New York)
 Delitto Carnale (Cesare Canaveri, 1982; English: Carnal Crime) a.k.a. Killing of the Flesh, a.k.a. Sensual Murder; also released as a hardcore adult version
 A Blade in the Dark (Lamberto Bava, 1983; Italian: La casa con la scala nel buio / The House with the Dark Staircase)
 Blood Link (Alberto De Martino, 1983) a.k.a. Extrasensorial The House of the Yellow Carpet (Carlo Lizzani, 1983;  Italian: La casa del tappeto giallo)
 Murder Rock (Lucio Fulci, 1984;  Italian: Murderock – uccide a passo di danza) a.k.a. The Demon Is Loose!, a.k.a. Murder Rock – Dancing Death Nothing Underneath (Carlo Vanzina, 1985; Italian: Sotto il vestito niente / Nothing Underneath the Dress) a.k.a. The Last Shot Formula for a Murder (Alberto De Martino, 1985) a.k.a. 7 Hyden Park – La casa maledetta / 7 Hyde Park - The Cursed House Phenomena (Dario Argento, 1985) a.k.a. Creepers Black Octopus (Marta Reguera, 1985; Spanish: Pulpo Negro) made for Argentinian TV
 The House of the Blue Shadows (Beppe Cino, 1986;  Italian: La casa del buon ritorno) a.k.a. The House with the Blue Shutters The Killer is Still Among Us (Camillo Teti, 1986; Italian: L'assassino è ancora tra noi)
 You'll Die at Midnight (Lamberto Bava, 1986; Italian: Morirai a mezzanotte) a.k.a. The Midnight Killer, a.k.a. Midnight Horror The Monster of Florence (Cesare Ferrario, 1986; Italian: Il mostro di firenze) a.k.a. Night Ripper Body Count (1986 film) (Ruggero Deodato, 1986; Italian: Camping Del Terrore)
 Delitti (Giovanna Lenzi, 1987; English: Crimes)
 Sweets from a Stranger (Franco Ferrini, 1987; Italian: Caramelle da uno sconosciuto)
 Stage Fright (Michele Soavi, 1987; Italian: Deliria) a.k.a. Aquarius, a.k.a. Bloody Bird Delirium (Lamberto Bava, 1987; Italian: Le foto di Gioia / Photos of Gioia)
 Opera (Dario Argento, 1987) a.k.a. Terror at the Opera 
 Phantom of Death (Ruggero Deodato, 1988; Italian: Un delitto poco comune / An Uncommon Crime) a.k.a. Off Balance Too Beautiful to Die (Dario Piana, 1988; Italian: Sotto il vestito niente 2 / Nothing Underneath 2)
 Dial: Help (Ruggero Deodato, 1988; Italian: Minaccia d'amore / Love Threat)
 Delitti e profumi (Vittorio De Sisti, 1988; English: Crimes and Perfume)
 Obsession: A Taste for Fear (Piccio Raffanini, 1988; Italian: Pathos: Un sapore di paura)
 The Murder Secret (Mario Bianchi, Lucio Fulci, 1988; Italian: Non aver paura della zia Marta / Don't Be Afraid of Aunt Martha) a.k.a.Aunt Martha Does Dreadful Things Massacre (Andrea Bianchi, 1989)
 Nightmare Beach (Umberto Lenzi, 1989) a.k.a. Welcome To Spring Break (slasher film)
 Dangerous Women (Luigi Russo, 1989; Italian: Le Diaboliche) a.k.a. Una donna senza nome / Woman Without a Name Dark Bar (Stelio Fiorenza, 1989) starring Barbara Cupisti
 Arabella, the Black Angel (Stelvio Massi, 1989) a.k.a. Black Angel American Rickshaw (Sergio Martino, 1989) starring Donald Pleasence
 Fashion Crimes (Bruno Gaburro, 1989; Italian: La morte è di moda)

1990s
 Homicide in Blue Light (Alfonso Brescia, 1991; Italian: Omicidio a luci blu) starring David Hess
 Misteria (Lamberto Bava, 1992) a.k.a. Body Puzzle; starring Joanna Pacula and Erika Blanc
 Circle of Fear (Aldo Lado, 1992) a.k.a.The Perfect Alibi; starring Burt Young
 Trauma (Dario Argento, 1993) a.k.a.Dario Argento's Trauma The Washing Machine (Ruggero Deodato, 1993; Italian: Vortice Mortale) filmed in Hungary
 Dangerous Attraction (Bruno Mattei, 1993) starring David Warbeck
 Gli occhi dentro (Bruno Mattei, 1993) a.k.a. Madness, a.k.a. Occhi Senza Volto / Eyes Without a Face Omicidio al Telefono (Bruno Mattei, 1994; Italian: Murder by Telephone) a.k.a. L'assassino e al telefono / The Killer is on the Phone The Strange Story of Olga O (Antonio Bonifacio, 1995) written by Ernesto Gastaldi, starring Florinda Bolkan
 The Killer's the One with the Yellow Shoes / L'assassino e' guello con le scarpe gialle (Filippo Otoni, 1995)
 The Stendhal Syndrome (Dario Argento, 1996; Italian: La sindrome di Stendhal) 
 The House Where Corinne Lived (Maurizio Lucidi, 1996; Italian: La casa dove abitava Corinne) made for TV movie 
 Fatal Frames (Al Festa, 1996) starring David Warbeck, Donald Pleasence and Linnea Quigley
 Wax Mask (Sergio Stivaletti, 1997; Italian: M.D.C. – Maschera di cera)
 Milonga (Emidio Greco, 1999)

2000s
 Sleepless (Dario Argento, 2001; Italian: Non ho sonno)
 Red Riding Hood (Giacomo Cimini, 2003) 
 Bad Inclination (Pierfrancesco Campanella, 2003: Italian: Cattive inclinazioni)
 The Card Player (Dario Argento, 2004; Italian: Il cartaio)
 Eyes of Crystal (Eros Puglielli, 2004; Italian: Occhi di cristallo)
 The Vanity Serum (Alex Infascelli, 2004; Italian: Il siero della vanità)
 Do You Like Hitchcock? (Dario Argento, 2005; Italian: Ti piace Hitchcock?)
 Giallo (Dario Argento, 2009)
2010s
 Symphony in Blood Red (Luigi Pastore, 2010)
 The Last Fashion Show (Carlo Vanzina, 2011; Italian: Sotto il vestito niente – L'ultima sfilata / Nothing Underneath: The Last Fashion Show)
 Sonno Profondo (Luciano Onetti, 2013)
 Francesca (Luciano Onetti, 2015)
 Abrakadabra (Luciano Onetti, 2018)
2020s
 Dark Glasses (Dario Argento, 2022; Italian: Occhiali Neri)

Notable personalities
Directors

 Silvio Amadio
 Dario Argento
 Francesco Barilli
 Lamberto Bava
 Mario Bava
 Luigi Bazzoni
 Sergio Bergonzelli
 Giuliano Carnimeo
 Paolo Cavara
 Armando Crispino
 Massimo Dallamano
 Alberto De Martino
 Ruggero Deodato
 Luciano Ercoli
 Riccardo Freda
 Lucio Fulci
 Romolo Guerrieri
 Aldo Lado
 Umberto Lenzi
 Michele Lupo
 Antonio Margheriti
 Sergio Martino
 Emilio Miraglia
 Brunello Rondi
 Salvatore Samperi
 Duccio Tessari

Writers

 Ennio de Concini
 Sandro Continenza
 Sergio Corbucci
 Ennio de Concini
 Sergio Donati
 Ernesto Gastaldi
 Mino Guerrini

Actors and actresses

 Simón Andreu
 Claudine Auger
 Ewa Aulin
 Barbara Bach
 Carroll Baker
 Eva Bartók
 Agostina Belli
 Femi Benussi
 Helmut Berger
 Erika Blanc
 Florinda Bolkan
 Barbara Bouchet
 Pier Paolo Capponi
 Adolfo Celi
 Orchidea De Santis
 Anita Ekberg
 Eduardo Fajardo
 Rossella Falk
 Mimsy Farmer
 Edwige Fenech
 James Franciscus
 Cristina Galbó
 Ida Galli
 Giancarlo Giannini
 Farley Granger
 Brett Halsey
 David Hemmings
 George Hilton
 Robert Hoffmann
 Annabella Incontrera
 Suzy Kendall
 Sylva Koscina
 Dagmar Lassander
 Philippe Leroy
 Helga Liné
 Beba Lončar
 Ray Lovelock
 Marina Malfatti
 Leonard Mann
 Marisa Mell
 Luc Merenda
 Macha Méril
 Tomas Milian
 Cameron Mitchell
 Silvia Monti
 Tony Musante
 Paul Naschy
 Nieves Navarro
 Rosalba Neri
 Franco Nero
 Daria Nicolodi
 Luciana Paluzzi
 Irene Papas
 Luigi Pistilli
 Ivan Rassimov
 Fernando Rey
 John Richardson
 George Rigaud
 Letícia Román
 Howard Ross
 John Saxon
 Erna Schürer
 Jean Sorel
 Anthony Steffen
 John Steiner
 Anita Strindberg
 Fabio Testi
 Gabriele Tinti
 Marilu Tolo
 Silvano Tranquilli

Composers

 Stelvio Cipriani
 Pino Donaggio
 Gianni Ferrio
 Giorgio Gaslini
 Goblin
 Ennio Morricone
 Bruno Nicolai
 Nora Orlandi
 Riz Ortolani
 Piero Piccioni
 Berto Pisano
 Carlo Savina
 Claudio Simonetti
 Armando Trovajoli
 Piero Umiliani

Sources:GIALLO IS THE HORROR SUBGENRE YOU NEED TO EXPLORE - Nerdlist

Films influenced by giallo

 Klute (Alan J. Pakula; 1971)  
 Frenzy (Alfred Hitchcock; 1972)
 Sisters (Brian De Palma; 1973)
 Alice, Sweet Alice (Alfred Sole, 1976)
 Eyes of Laura Mars ( Irvin Kershner; 1978)'Eyes of Laura Mars' is a Giallo-Esque Treasure Ready for Rediscovery - Dread Central
 Halloween (John Carpenter; 1978)
 Cruising (William Friedkin; 1980) 
 Friday the 13th (Sean S. Cunningham; 1980)
 Dressed to Kill (Brian De Palma; 1980)
 Happy Birthday to Me ( J. Lee Thompson; 1981)
 Blow Out (Brian De Palma; 1981)What are giallo movies? Horror's moodiest genre, explained - Polygon
 Next of Kin (Tony Williams; 1982)
 Pieces (Juan Piquer Simón; 1982)
 Body Double (Brian De Palma; 1984)
 Basic Instinct (Paul Verhoeven 1992)
 Seven (David Fincher; 1995)
 Last Night in Soho (Edgar Wright; 2021)
 Malignant'' (James Wan, 2021)

See also

 Arthouse action film
 Detective fiction
 Erotic thriller
 Exploitation fiction
 Exploitation film
 Extreme cinema
 Fantastique
 Grand Guignol
 Maximalist film
 Minimalist film
 Murder mystery
 Mystery fiction
 Mystery film
 New Hollywood
 Poliziotteschi
 Psychedelic film
 Psychological horror
 Psychological thriller
 Pulp magazine
 Slasher film
 Splatter film
 Vulgar auteurism
 Weird menace
 Whodunit

References

External links
 Giallo at AllMovie
 Trailer for the 2019 documentary All the Colors of Giallo on Severin Films official YouTube channel

 
Giallo film directors
Film genres
Horror genres
Italian films by genre
Italian literature
Italian words and phrases
Italian horror thriller films
Women and death
Thrillers
1960s in film
1970s in film
1980s in Italian cinema
1990s in Italian cinema
2000s in Italian cinema
2010s in Italian cinema